Dimes v Grand Junction Canal (1852) was a case heard by the House of Lords.

The case addresses the point that "Judges must not appear to be biased". Lord Cottenham presided over a previous case in which a canal company brought a case in equity against a landowner. Lord Cottenham was later discovered to have had shares in said company. The verdict stated that although there was no suggestion that the Lord Chancellor had in fact been influenced by his interest in the company, no case should be decided by a judge with a financial interest in the outcome. It was held that the Lord Chancellor was disqualified from sitting as a judge in the case because he had an interest in the action.

References 
Dimes v Grand Junction Canal (1852) sixthformlaw.info
Pdf document regarding a speech by Lord Cambell in the house of lords and certain facts regarding the House of Lords case.

House of Lords cases
1852 in case law
1852 in British law
English law articles needing infoboxes